Marianne was a weekly Paris-based French illustrated magazine that appeared in France, between 1932 and 1940.

History
Marianne was founded on 26 October 1932 by Gaston Gallimard and edited under director Emmanuel Berl, until 1937. It began being published under the umbrella corporation ZED, which had been established in 1928. The magazine was sold in January of 1937, to Raymond Patenôtre and relaunched by André Cornu in 1938. It described itself as the Grand hebdomadaire littéraire illustré ("Great illustrated literary weekly").

Marianne was said to be a 'Paris Liberal Weekly' publication, and a "weekly of French interests and ideas."

When it was relaunched in 1938, Patenôtre let it remain politically slightly left of centre. Among the notable contributors was Léon Werth, who regularly contributed to the magazine.

Marianne was noted also for its anti-Nazi illustrations between 1938 and 1940, including by Jacob Kjeldgaard, Danish journalist photographer. Publication of Marianne was suspended by the Nazi-collaborating Vichy France regime on 4 September 1940.  The Vichy France regime had already begun censoring portions of it, at least from 14 August of that year.

See also
Marianne (magazine)

References

1932 establishments in France
French-language magazines
Magazines established in 1932
Magazines published in Paris